The Massacre of Salussola consists in the execution, preceded by torture,  of 20 Italian Partisans, committed in retaliation by Italian Fascist soldiers on March 9, 1945, in the town of Salussola (Italy).

The facts 
In late February 1945, the 109th Garibaldi Brigade, was moving across Piedmont (N.W. Italy) which at the time was occupied by German troops and held by the Italian MVSN, ("Milizia Volontaria per la Sicurezza Nazionale"). During the march, a detachment of "Zoppis" made up of 33 partisans, stopped to rest in a farmhouse in the Province of Vercelli.
In the early hours of March 1, they were taken by surprise and taken prisoner by a Command of Italian Fascist soldiers. The thirty-three men were all taken to different places and a group of twenty-one was led towards the small town of Biella. The Fascista soldier then pretended to create an exchange with German prisoners. but in Salussola, after a whole night of torture and violences documented by the only one survivor, the prisoners were killed by machine guns at dawn on March 9, 1945. The massacre was intended as a reprisal to an attack conducted a few days earlier by other Partisans to a column of military trucks of the "Montebello"’s Fascist Command, which were moving through Salussola. A truck was destroyed in the attack and four soldiers killed.

The victims

Note: Alias (noms de guerre) were a very important part in the life of the Partisans. Mainly used to conceal the true identity (it was a clandestine army) the Alias name outlined also in most cases the character and the personality of the owners. It thus enabled at the same time to hide oneself outside, and to be recognized inside among the other Partisans for a personal, moral or physical  characteristic.
 Buscaglino Francesco  alias "Barbera" born in Pray (Bi) on 1902
 Costa Luigi alias "Gigi" born in Masserano (Bi) on 1906
 Foglia Bruno alias "Ebano" born in Crevacuore (Bi) on 1926
 Marchesini Valter alias "Orlando" born in Crevacuore (Bi) on 1925
 Menti Gino alias "Colassi" born in Pray (Bi) on 1914
 Nicolini Angelo alias "Budda" born in Cureggio (No) on 1925
 Ortoleva Giovanni alias "Iacon" born in Isnello (Pa) on 1921
 Picco Giuseppe alias "Trento" born in Roasio (Vc) on 1916
 Pela Francesco alias "Cirillo" born in Pray (Bi) il 1893
 Ronchi Antonio alias "Figaro" born in Lessona (Bi) on 1920
 Riboldazzi Guido alias "Pulcino" born in Crevacuore (Bi) on 1923
 Rocca Florindo alias "Lince" born in Crocemosso ora Vallemosso (Bi) on 1920
 Rocca Giulio alias "Gino" born in Crocemosso ora Vallemosso (Bi) on 1920
 Sesia Gaudenzio alias "Sesia" born in Novara on 1925
 Salis Gerardo alias "Palmiro" born ind Asigliano (Vc) on 1926
 Tempia Valenta Edo alias "Brunello" born in Mezzana (Bi) on 1926
 Tondi Enrico alias "Vecio" born in Lessona (Bi) on 1900
 Tondi Dante alias "Legnano" born in Lessona (Bi) on 1915
 Tugnolo Rolando alias "Dispari" born in Collobiano (Vc) on 1926
 Tosin Valentino alias "Bissa" born in Mezzana (Bi) on 1911

See also
 Sant'Anna di Stazzema massacre
 Lidice
 Kľak
 Oradour-sur-Glane
 Ochota massacre
 Khatyn massacre
 Italian Campaign (World War II)
 List of massacres in Italy
 German war crimes

References

Sources
 ad memoriam (in Italian) audio testimony of the only partisan who escaped the massacre
 "Sala dell'eccidio" (in Italian)  "Slaughter's room" set up in the Museum–Laboratory of gold and stone in Salussola.
 I 20 trucidati names and images of the 20 murdered partisans.
  Statement made by the priest father Giuseppe Dotto on October 19th 1945 the commander of the Police Station of Salussola.  (in Italian).
 The speech of the Minister of Defense Antonio Martino in 2002 (in Italian)
 Photos of Commemoration 2002 – Ministry of Defence
 The Partisan "Pittore" is named Knight of the Republic (in Italian)

March 1945 events
Massacres in 1945
Battles and operations of World War II
Massacres in Italy
Collective punishment
1945 in Italy
Mass murder in 1945
World War II massacres